The Jebuc is a right tributary of the river Almaș in Romania. It flows into the Almaș near the village Almașu.

References

Rivers of Romania
Rivers of Sălaj County